Rachel Seiffert (born 1971) is a British novelist and short story writer.

Biography 
She was born in 1971 in Oxford to German and Australian parents, and was brought up bilingually. She lives in London.

Publications and awards 
Seiffert has published five works of fiction to date:

The Dark Room (2001) is a novel, shortlisted for the Booker Prize and the Guardian First Book Award in 2001, winner of the LA Times Prize for First Fiction and a Betty Trask Award in 2002. The 2012 movie Lore by writer-director Cate Shortland is based on The Dark Room.

Field Study (2004) is a collection of short stories, one of which received an award from International PEN.

Afterwards (2007) is a novel, long-listed for the Orange Prize for Fiction the same year.

The Walk Home (2014) is a novel set in Glasgow about a family torn apart.

A Boy in Winter (2017) is a novel set during the 1941 German invasion of the Ukraine during Operation Barbarossa.

Seiffert was named as one of Granta magazine's 20 Best of Young British Novelists in 2003, and her short story "Field Study" was included in the subsequent collection.

In 2011, she received the E. M. Forster Award from the American Academy of Arts and Letters.

Her books have been translated into ten languages.

Subjects 
Seiffert's subject is the individual in history: how political and economic upheavals impact on ordinary lives.  Her characters have included the 12-year-old daughter of an SS officer in 1945, a Polish seasonal worker on a German asparagus farm after the fall of the Berlin Wall, and a London painter and decorator who killed a civilian as a 19-year-old squaddie with the British Army in Northern Ireland during the Troubles.

References 

1971 births
Living people
Writers from Oxford
British women novelists
British women short story writers
21st-century British novelists
21st-century British women writers